Oncidium wentworthianum is a species of orchid occurring from Mexico through Guatemala to El Salvador.

External links

wentworthianum
Orchids of Mexico
Orchids of Belize
Orchids of El Salvador
Orchids of Guatemala
Orchids of Chiapas